Axel Zihiri Kacou (born 1 August 1995) is an Ivorian footballer who plays as a goalkeeper for Sporting Club Lyon.

Club career
As a youth, Kacou trained at Clairefontaine, before joining Saint-Étienne.

In January 2016, Kacou joined Thonon Évian F.C. from Saint-Étienne, having agreed a -year contract.

In August 2016, he moved to Tours FC on a two-year deal.

In June 2019, he signed a two-year deal with Lyon-Duchère. Lyon-Duchère rebranded as Sporting Club Lyon in June 2020.

International career
Kacou was born in France to parents of Ivorian descent. He originally represented the France U16s. He then switched to the Ivory Coast U23s for the 2015 Toulon Tournament.

In November 2016, Kacou was first called up to the senior Ivory Coast squad for a 2018 FIFA World Cup qualifiers match against Morocco. He was selected by new coach Marc Wilmots in May 2017 for a friendly against the Netherlands and a 2019 Africa Cup of Nations qualifier against Guinea. In March 2018, he was again called up for a friendly against Togo.

References

1995 births
Living people
Sportspeople from Saint-Denis, Seine-Saint-Denis
Association football goalkeepers
Citizens of Ivory Coast through descent
Ivorian footballers
Ivory Coast under-20 international footballers
French footballers
France youth international footballers
French sportspeople of Ivorian descent
Ligue 2 players
Championnat National players
Championnat National 2 players
Championnat National 3 players
AS Saint-Étienne players
Thonon Evian Grand Genève F.C. players
Tours FC players
Lyon La Duchère players
Footballers from Seine-Saint-Denis